PP-209 Khanewal-VII is a constituency of the Provincial Assembly of Punjab.

General elections 2013

http://www.electionpakistani.com/ge2013/pp/PP-218.htm

General elections 2008

See also
 PP-208 Khanewal-VI
 PP-210 Khanewal-VIII

References

External links
 Election commission Pakistan's official website
 Awazoday.com check result
 Official Website of Government of Punjab

Provincial constituencies of Punjab, Pakistan